Sword Songs is the eighth full-length album by Swedish heavy metal band Grand Magus. It was released on 13 May 2016 on Nuclear Blast.

Track listing
"Freja's Choice" – 4:00
"Varangian" – 3:40
"Forged in Iron – Crowned in Steel" – 5:38
"Born for Battle (Black Dog of Brocéliande)" – 3:41
"Master of the Land" – 3:51
"Last One to Fall" – 4:01
"Frost and Fire" – 3:16
"Hugr" (instrumental) – 2:07
"Every Day There's a Battle to Fight" – 4:31
"In for the Kill" – 3:37 (bonus track)
"Stormbringer" (Deep Purple cover) – 5:03 (bonus track)

Personnel 
Janne "JB" Christoffersson – guitars, vocals
Mats "Fox" Skinner – bass
Ludwig "Ludde" Witt – drums

References 

Grand Magus albums
2016 albums
Nuclear Blast albums